Solomonov is a surname, it may refer to:

 Solomonoff induction or Inductive inference, a theory of predicting based on observations
 Doina Furcoi Solomonov (born 1945), Romanian handball player
 Ray Solomonoff (1926–2009), mathematician involved in machine learning